Jigmastas are an East Coast underground hip hop group based in Brooklyn. The group consists of DJ Spinna and MC Kriminul.

History
DJ Spinna, was already renowned throughout the 1990s, and as well already knew Kriminul from the mid-1980s. Jigmastas' recording debut was in Rude Rydims' "Everybody Bounce" on Freeze Records in 1995. The duo released their first single "Beyond Real" which became an underground rap hit, and inspired the name of their self-funded record label, "Beyond Real Recordings," in 1996. To please their fans, Jigmastas released another single, "Last Will and Testimony" released by Tommy Boy Black Label and finally the debut LP album Grass Roots: Lyrical Fluctuation in 2000. In the May 2001, the high anticipated debut album Infectious featuring the former guitarist of Living Colour, Vernon Reid and rapper Sadat X.

Discography

Reception

External links
DJ Spinna's official website

American musical duos
Hip hop duos
Musical groups established in 1996
Hip hop groups from New York City
Underground hip hop groups